Old Perlican is a fishing village on the Avalon Peninsula, Newfoundland and Labrador in Canada. Incorporated in 1971, it is one of the oldest fishing communities in Newfoundland; it served as the major fishing station in Trinity Bay for migratory fisherman from England in the 17th century.

History
Its name was recorded as "Parlican" as early as 1597, with the "old" being added sometime later to distinguish it from New Perlican further up the bay.

It was settled by at least 1640. A "planter" (an early settler or colonist) named John Barrett (1654-1714) lived there after arriving from Poole, England in 1711. One of, if not, the oldest recorded English land transaction in Newfoundland archives is between John Barrett and John Carter in 1711 in Old Perlican. The original is in the St. John's archives and a photocopy hangs in the Old Perlican Town Hall.

Timeline
 1597 - Old Perlican was first mentioned as "Parlican". At this time, Old Perlican is a summer fishery station for migratory fishermen.
 1675 - First Newfoundland Census lists fourteen planters.
 1697 - (February) - French under D'Iberville capture Old Perlican. They report that there are "19 houses, several stores, more than thirty head of horned cattle, and a number of sheep and pigs". During King William's War, the village was destroyed in the Avalon Peninsula Campaign.
 1729 - Old Perlican is one of 11 harbors in Newfoundland to warrant the appointment of justice of the peace.
 1856 - Way Office established.
 1883 - First Postmaster was George Tuff.

Demographics 

Attractions
 Old Perlican Harbour Authority
 Beckett Heritage Property
 Historical Graves
 "The Captains Inn" bed and breakfast
 Trinity South D'Iberville Trail (Northern Terminus)

Notable people
 Marilyn Churley, former Ontario MPP
 William James Herder, founder of Newfoundland's first daily newspaper

See also
 List of cities and towns in Newfoundland and Labrador

References

External links
The Ballad Of George Alfred Becket
Old Perlican - Encyclopedia of Newfoundland and Labrador, vol. 4, p. 164-165.

Populated coastal places in Canada
Towns in Newfoundland and Labrador
Fishing communities
Fishing communities in Canada